Snježan "Snješko" Cerin (born 18 January 1955) is a retired Croatian association football striker who spent most of his career playing for his hometown club Dinamo Zagreb in the Yugoslav First League in the 1970s and 1980s.

Club career
A native of Zagreb, Cerin started playing at NK Trnje, a small local club, in the early 1970s. In 1976, he moved to another local side, the third level minnows NK Zagrebački Plavi (who later merged with NK Zagreb in 1980). In April 1976 the Yugoslavia national football team decided to play a training match against Zagrebački Plavi in preparation for their UEFA Euro 1976 qualifier versus Wales played in Zagreb. The game proved to be a turning point for Cerin as he scored a hat-trick versus the national team and their stalwart goalkeeper Ognjen Petrović.

Cerin instantly became sought after by top clubs. He was first invited by Tomislav Ivić to join Hajduk Split but the deal never materialised as Ivić had left Hajduk for Netherlands at the end of the 1975–76 season to take over Ajax. Dinamo Zagreb then offered him a contract and Cerin joined the club for the 1976–77 season. Cerin then had to wait for his Dinamo debut almost six months under coach Mirko Bazić - he scored his first goal for Dinamo in a 3–1 friendly win against GOŠK Dubrovnik on 10 November 1976 and his league debut came a week later on 17 November in a 6–1 home win against Budućnost in which he scored two goals. His first goal against international opposition came in a 4–0 win against Ajax led by Tomislav Ivić at the Trofej Marjan international tournament played in Split on 17 February 1977.

A very prolific scorer, he led the club to their first league title in 24 years in the 1981–82 season, also becoming the league's top scorer with 19 goals. In his ten seasons with Dinamo between 1976 and 1986 he also won two Yugoslav Cups (1980 and 1983) and was the club's leading goalscorer five times. He made a total of 474 appearances and scored 295 goals for the Blues, including 216 appearances and 101 goals in the Yugoslav First League, and holds the record as the club's top scorer of the Yugoslav era. Alongside players such as Marko Mlinarić and Zlatko Kranjčar Cerin is regarded as one of the symbols of one of the most successful periods in Dinamo's history, in which they also finished as runners-up in the league twice (1976–77, 1978–79) and runners-up in the cup three times (1982, 1985, 1986). However, in spite of his excellent scoring record, Cerin was constantly overlooked by national team managers and was never called up for Yugoslavia.

In late 1985 Cerin had a short stint in the American Major Indoor Soccer League (where he was referred to as John Cerin) and scored a single goal in three matches for Kansas City Comets before being recalled to Dinamo by manager Miroslav Blažević in the winter break of the 1985–86 season. Cerin finally left the club in 1986 and played a single season at SK Austria Klagenfurt (present-day FC Kärnten) in Austria. He then returned to Zagreb and appeared in a handful of games for another small local side NK Novi Zagreb (present-day Hrvatski Dragovoljac) before retiring from football.

Cerin then opened a pub in Zagreb which he ran into the 1990s. In 2001, he moved to Privlaka, a small town near the coastal city of Zadar, where he runs a small retirement home.

Honours
Club
Yugoslav First League (1): 1981–82
Yugoslav Cup (2): 1979–80, 1982–83
Individual
Yugoslav First League top scorer (1): 1981–82 (19)

References

External links
Career summary at Zagreb Blues, Dinamo Zagreb fan site

1955 births
Living people
Footballers from Zagreb
Association football forwards
Yugoslav footballers
GNK Dinamo Zagreb players
Kansas City Comets (original MISL) players
FC Kärnten players
Yugoslav First League players
Major Indoor Soccer League (1978–1992) players
Yugoslav expatriate footballers
Expatriate soccer players in the United States
Yugoslav expatriate sportspeople in the United States
Expatriate footballers in Austria
Yugoslav expatriate sportspeople in Austria